Armen Masihi Kocharian, is an Iranian Armenian physician and cardiologist who is the first children's Heart Specialist in Iran.

Early life
Kocharian was born in Gholhak, a neighbourhood in Northern Tehran, in 1948. He attended the Kooshesh Armenian High School. Later, he enrolled in the Medical field of Ahvaz Jundishapur University of Medical Sciences, in 1969. He graduated in 1976. He received to Pediatrician in 1981. Finally, he received a specialty in the discipline of cardiology with an emphasis on children from the Iran University of Medical Sciences. Now, he is a faculty member and professor in Tehran University of Medical sciences Children's Medical Center.

Important Papers

 Evaluation of the relationship of echocardiographic left ventricular mass to amounts of transfusions of packed cell and Deferoxamine in Thalassemia major
 MUMPS MYOCARDITIS AS A CAUSE OF NEONATAL CARDIOGENIC SHOCK
 PROLONGED DISPERSION OF QT AND QTC IN THALASSEMIA MAJOR PATIENTS
 A Newborn Infant with a Pulsatile Substernal Structure in a Midline Defect; Cantrell's Syndrome

See also
 Iranian Armenians
 Science in Iran

Footnotes

Iranian cardiologists
Ethnic Armenian physicians
Living people
People from Tehran
1948 births
Iranian people of Armenian descent
20th-century Iranian people
21st-century Iranian people